Seven Hours Difference is a Bulgarian television drama, which premiered on 18 September 2011 on bTV. It followed the life of a respectable judge with a connection to the mafia, her family and friends. The action was set in Bulgaria and in the USA. The characters in the TV series are inspired by real people.

Premise
Tanya Stoeva is a judge with a strong but controversial connection to her childhood friend Mihail Mihaylov - Miloto, a mafia boss. Tanya's daughter - Maya, is in love with Teo, the son of a famous reporter but Rocky - Mihail's son, wants her for himself. After a night spent together, Maya and Teo are attacked and Maya is brutally raped. After this Tanya sends Maya to her brother in the USA - Boyan. When Tanya begins to suspect Rocky for the rape, a new prosecutor is hired to solve the case.

Development

After the big success of the first Bulgarian TV series made after a pause of almost two decades, bTV ordered the pilot for Seven Hours Difference. The series was sold to the Macedonian television network Kanal 5 before it premiered in Bulgaria. The premiere was on 18 September 2011. The first few episodes had very high ratings but after a while viewership dropped to a steady level. Despite that, Seven Hours Difference remains one of the most popular Bulgarian productions ever to be broadcast.

A second season was ordered during the production of the 15th episode. The first season ended on 18 December 2011, spanning 26 episodes.

The pilot ran as a whole 2 hours episode(with commercials), but ever since bTV airs two consequential 1 hour episodes, which although having each an intro and outro, don't seem to be separate. The first season finale was also a two-hour episode.

References

External links 
 Official website
 

2011 Bulgarian television series debuts
2013 Bulgarian television series endings
Bulgarian television series
2010s Bulgarian television series
BTV (Bulgaria) original programming